Count Kirill Grigoryevich Razumovski, anglicized as Cyril Grigoryevich Razumovski (romanized: Kyrylo Hryhorovych Rozumovskyi; 18 March 1728 – 1 January 1803) was a Russian Imperial statesman of Ukrainian Cossack descent, who served as the last Hetman of Zaporozhian Host on both sides of the Dnieper (from 1750 until 1764) and then as a Field marshal in the Russian Imperial Army. Razumovsky was the President of the St. Petersburg Imperial Academy of Sciences from 1746 until 1798.

Biography

Razumovsky was born to a family of low rank Cossack Hryhoriy Rozum in Lemeshi Russian Empire, Kiev Regiment on 18 March 1728. The village Lemeshi where Razumovsky was born to this day stands in Chernihiv Raion, Chernihiv Oblast, Ukraine.

From 1743 to 1744 Kirill Razumovsky incognito attended the University of Göttingen. Razumovsky's adjutant in his journey to Germany was Grigory Teplov. Teplov wielded influence over Little Russia in his capacity as the secretary and advisor to Kirill Razumovsky (whose cousin he married). Razumovsky was appointed President of the Russian Academy of Sciences when he just turned 18 years old due to the influence of his brother, Aleksey Razumovsky, the morganatic husband of Empress Elisabeth of Russia.

In 1750, Razumovsky was elected and subsequently appointed Hetman of Zaporizhian Host, a title he held until Catherine II of Russia abolished this title in 1764, in exchange Razumovsky was granted a rank of Field marshal of Russian Army in 1764. During his service as Hetman of Zaporizhian Host, Baturin was re-established as residence of Hetman and Razumovsky had opulent baroque palaces erected both in Baturin as well as in Glukhov by the imperial architect Andrey Kvasov and Charles Cameron. Together with Grigory Teplov he also planned to open a university in Baturin. Kirill Razumovsky died in January 1803 in Baturin, where he was interred according to his wishes without any pomp, in stark contrast to his rather flamboyant lifestyle.

Kirill married Yekaterina Naryshkina and had five sons, of whom Count Aleksey Kirillovich Razumovsky (1748-1822) was the Minister of Education in 1810–16, and Prince Andrey Razumovsky (1752-1836) was the Russian plenipotentiary ambassador in Vienna in the years of the Congress 1814–1815. However, Andrey has become better known for his role as patron of Ludwig van Beethoven who dedicated three String Quartets, Op.59 1, 2 and 3, as well as the 5th and 6th Symphonies to him. Any living descendants in the male line of Kirill Razumovsky arise from the progeniture of his fourth son Gregory Razumovsky (1759-1837), who had to emigrate to Western Europe and acquired relative fame as natural scientist and member of a number of distinguished scientific societies in Austria, Prussia and Switzerland.

Arms

Memory
On Day of Unity of Ukraine in 2009 was solemnly presented a monument "The Hetmans. The Prayer for Ukraine". This monument immortalises five hetmans - Demian Ihnatovych, Ivan Samoilovych, Ivan Mazepa, Pylyp Orlyk and Kirill Razumovsky - in Baturyn, Chernihiv Region.

Literature
 Maria Razumovsky. Die Rasumovskys: eine Familie am Zarenhof. Köln 1998. — 300 S.

References

External links
 Kyrylo Rozumovsky at the Encyclopedia of Ukraine
 Kyrylo Rozumovsky at the Jurist Encyclopedia
 Palace's secrets. Kirill Razumovskiy, the Last Hetman. Kultura TV Channel (Russia).
 Koliada, I; Milko, V. Kyrylo Rozumovsky. "Folio".
 Kyrylo Rozumovsky. Ukrainians in the World.
 Soroka, Yu. Hetmanless period and the last Hetman of Ukraine.

1728 births
1803 deaths
People from Chernihiv Oblast
People from Kiev Governorate (1708–1764)
Ukrainian people in the Russian Empire
People from the Cossack Hetmanate
University of Göttingen alumni
Hetmans of Zaporizhian Host
Field marshals of Russia
Kirill
Torbanists
Full members of the Saint Petersburg Academy of Sciences
18th-century Ukrainian people
Recipients of the Order of St. Anna, 4th class
Recipients of the Order of St. Anna, 3rd class
Recipients of the Order of St. Anna, 2nd class
Recipients of the Order of St. Anna, 1st class
Recipients of the Order of the White Eagle (Poland)